WP Theater (formerly known as Women's Project Theater) is a not-for-profit Off-Broadway theater based in New York City. It is the nation’s oldest and largest theater company dedicated to developing, producing and promoting the work of female-identified theater artists at every stage in their careers. Currently, Lisa McNulty serves as the Producing Artistic Director and Michael Sag serves as the Managing Director.

Background
WP Theater was founded in 1978 by Julia Miles to address the conspicuous underrepresentation of women artists working in the American theater. Miles was producing at The American Place Theatre, an Off-Broadway theater dedicated to producing new work by American writers. Miles began as Assistant Manager at The American Place Theatre in 1964 and advanced in the ranks to Associate Director. During this time, she noted the lack of plays written by women being produced by The American Place Theatre in comparison to those written by men. Under a grant from the Ford Foundation, Miles created The Women’s Project under the umbrella of The American Place Theatre to encourage the development of female playwrights and directors and to provide a forum for their work. For its first nine years, WP Theater staged its productions in the basement of The American Place Theatre. In 1987, the project left The American Place Theatre and became an independent organization, known today as WP Theater. In 1998, the project bought a church at 424 West 55th Street, also the site of Theater Four, which was named the Julia Miles Theater in 2004.

WP Theater aims to empower artists who have historically been marginalized for their gender or gender expression to reach their full potential. The fundamental components of WP Theater are the Mainstage Season, the WP Lab and Pipeline Festival, and the annual Women of Achievement Awards gala.

WP Theater artist alumni include Billie Allen, Anne Bogart, Pearl Cleage, Eve Ensler, María Irene Fornés, Pam MacKinnon, Dominique Morisseau, Lynn Nottage, Joyce Carol Oates, Diane Paulus, Sarah Ruhl, Anna Deavere Smith, and Rebecca Taichman.

Actors who have performed in WP Theater productions include Tony Award winners and nominees Michael Cerveris, Kathleen Chalfant, Colleen Dewhurst, Tammy Grimes, Cherry Jones, Tonya Pinkins, Daphne Rubin-Vega, Thomas Sadoski, and Frances Sternhagen, Academy Award winners and nominees Linda Hunt, Kim Hunter, and Mary McDonnell, and Emmy Award winners and nominees Ruby Dee, America Ferrera, Sarah Jessica Parker, Jimmy Smits, and John Spencer. Other actors who have performed in WP Theater productions include Adrienne C. Moore, Pedro Pascal, and Tracie Thoms.

Alumni of the WP Lab include JoAnne Akalaitis, Tea Alagić, Rachel Chavkin, Quíara Alegria Hudes, and Anne Kauffman. Many Lab alumni have served as Artistic Directors at other theater companies, including Akalaitis (New York Shakespeare Festival and the Public Theater), Emily Mann (McCarter Theatre), and Carey Perloff (A.C.T.).

WP Theater founder Julia Miles died March 18, 2020.

Productions 
Since 1978, WP Theater has produced more than 600 Off-Broadway plays and developmental projects and has partnered with a number of other New York theater companies for co-productions, including Playwrights Horizons and The New Group. Often, WP Theater produces plays that are New York premieres or world premieres. These include Bright Half Life written by Tanya Barfield and directed by Leigh Silverman, Stuffed by Lisa Lampanelli, Or, by Liz Duffy Adams, and Virginia Woolf's only play, Freshwater, directed by Anne Bogart.

WP Theater's first production was Choices, a one-woman show that was adapted from the works of Colette, Virginia Woolf, Dorothy Parker, Gertrude Stein, Sylvia Plath, Adrienne Rich, and Joan Didion, amongst others. It was conceived by writer Patricia Bosworth and adapted by Bosworth, director Caymichael Patten, and actress Lily Lodge. Choices ran from November 30 to December 17, 1978, in the American Place Theatre basement. Julia Miles said the production "explores the choices that women have. Hopefully, there are now more of those choices and women are more definite about what they are." After the production opened, Mel Gussow of The New York Times wrote, " Choices serves as a brief introduction to the artistic energy of literary women. Given the variety of versatile people who are engaged in the 'Women's Project', we look forward to the plays, playwrights, and directors that should emerge from the American Place."

In 1981, WP Theater produced Still Life, a documentary-style play about the aftermath of the Vietnam War written and directed by Emily Mann. The production featured Mary McDonnell, Timothy Near, and John Spencer and earned four Obie Awards, including the award for Best Production.

One of WP Theater’s most heralded productions is A...My Name is Alice, a revue of songs and sketches conceived and directed by Julianne Boyd and Joan Micklin Silver. The production earned the Outer Critics Circle Award for Best Revue in the 1983/84 season and featured songs and scenes penned by Cassandra Medley, Winnie Holzman, Marta Kauffman, Anne Meara, and others.

WP Theater has worked closely with Cuban-American playwright, María Irene Fornés, since its inception. Fornés, a Pulitzer Prize nominee and nine-time Obie Award winner, is known for her avant-garde and experimental plays. WP Theater has produced three Fornés plays, including Abingdon Square, which earned the 1988 Obie for Best New American Play.

The Lab 
The Lab is a two-year residency for female-identified playwrights, directors, and producers. Members of the Lab are selected through a highly competitive application and interview process. The Lab provides its members with a vital professional network, entrepreneurial and leadership training, rehearsal space, and opportunities for the development and production of bold new work for the stage.

The Lab began as the Directors Forum, created in 1983. In 1992, WP added the Playwrights Lab. The Producers Lab was added in 2006 to enhance the collaborative nature of the residency.

The Lab has two main goals: to cultivate the work of the participating artists and to give them the tools they need to succeed in the industry. In addition to developing their own unique work, Lab artists collaboratively create a culminating residency production. Since 2016, Lab members’ work has been showcased at the biennial Pipeline Festival. For the month-long Pipeline Festival, groups of three—one writer, one director, and one producer—come together to collaborate on a piece.

Prior to 2016, Lab members would devise new work, showcased in a production at the end of the residency term. These productions include The Architecture of Becoming (2014), We Play for the Gods (2012), Global Cooling: The Women Chill (2009), Corporate Carnival (2008), and Girls Just Wanna Have Fund$ (2007).

Prior to 2004, the Lab did not function on a two-year rotation.

Under the auspices of WP Theater, the 2008/2010 Lab Playwrights published Out of Time and Place, a two-volume anthology of plays, including contributions from 11 Lab playwrights and an introduction by Theresa Rebeck.

Many Lab artists continue to work together long after their official residency ends, and WP Theater continues to advocate for its Lab alumnae by brokering agents, providing references, and submitting their work to theaters around the country. WP Theater also hires many Lab artists for main stage productions.

WP Lab alumnae

Playwrights Lab members 1992–2004 

Liz Duffy Adams
Janet Allard
Taylor Barton
Neena Beber
Tish Benson
Chantal Bilodeau
Kitty Chen
Paula Cizmar
Cynthia L. Cooper (Cindy)
Cheryl L. Davis
Margie Duffield
Linda Faigao-Hall
Catherine Filloux
Daisy Foote
Juliana Francis
Aimee Gallin
Barbara Goldman
Dana Leslie Goldstein
Daphne Greaves
Monika Gross
Susan Eve Haar
Lisa Humbertson
Michael angel Johnson
Jake-Ann Jones
Mona Koppelman
Carson Kreitzer
Michele Aldin Kushner
Margaret Lamb
Ji Hyun Lee
Stephanie Lehmann
Lucy Lehrer
Andrea Lepcio
Patricia Lin
Jessica Litwak
Nancy Lubet
Carol Mack
Julie McKee
Cassandra Medley
Kim Merrill
Lyssa Miller
Rachelle Minkoff
Debbie Mitchell
Chiori Miyagawa
Lesli-Jo Morizono
Laura Quinn
Elizabeth Scales Rheinfrank
Carmen Rivera
Kate Robin
Alva Rogers
Sharyn Rothstein
Sarah Ruhl
Gail Sheehy
Jane Shepard
Marina Shron
Lynda Sturner
Judy Tate
Tracy Thorne
Alexandra Tolk
Sheri Wilner
Beth Windsor

Directors Lab/Directors Forum members 1983–2004 

Joyce Aaron
Josephine Abady
JoAnne Akalaitis
Merry Alderman
Billie Allen
Marcella Andre
Cecelia Antoinette
Marcy Arlin
Alexandra Aron
Linda Atkinson
Julie Fei-Fan Balzer
Mirra Bank
Lisa Barnes
Sue Batchelor
Jessica Bauman
Meghan Beals
Alma Becker
Suzanne Bennett
Melia Bensussen
Jackie Berger
Randee Mia Berman
Hilary Blecher
Donna Tomas Bond
Robin Bowers
Julianne Boyd
Veronica Brady
Yanna Kroyt Brandt
Celia Braxton
Margot Brier
Brooke Brod
Page Burkholder
Carolyn Cantor
Juliette Carrillo
Laurie Carlos
Kay Carney
Lenora Champagne
Allyn Chandler
Tisa Chang
Linda Chapman
Linda Cholodenko
Nancy S. Chu
Marya Cohn
Michelle Coleman
Beatriz Cordoba
Lee Costello
Sarah Davie
Diane L. Dawson
Lenore DeKoven
Heather de Michele
Peg Denithorne
Judy Dennis
Liz Diamond
Toni Dorfman
Annie Dorsen
Imani Douglas
Anne D'Zmura
Mary Beth Easley
April-Dawn Gladu
Carol Goodheart
Andra Gordon
Jennifer Uphoff Gray
Monika Gross
Robin Guarino
Denise Hamilton
Dana Iris Harrel
Ludovica Villar Hausar
Yvette Hawkins
Rosemary Hay
Catherine M. Head
Elizabeth A. Herron
Amy Holston
Beth Howard
Lisa Jackson
Meachie Jones
Melanie Joseph
Zoya Kachadurian
Mia Katigbak
Sonoko Kawahara
Anne Kauffman
Rasa Allan Kazlas
Francoise Kourilsky
Rachel Kranz
Ari Laura Kreith
Kati Kuroda
Mahayana Landowne
Renee LaTulippe
Sue Lawless
Susan Leaming
Sondra Lee
Karen Lordi
Kathryn Long
Karen Ludwig
Jill Mackavey
Pam MacKinnon
Emily Mann
Jamie Marcu
Elysa Marden
Marya Mazor
Tricia McDermott
Kate Mennone
Maria Mileaf
Mary Louise Miller
Vernice P. Miller
Kym Moore
Isis Saratial Misdary
Kathryn Moroney
Ariel Julia Nazarian
Timothy Near
Renfreu Neff
Deborah Nitzberg
Gail Noppe-Brandon
Elisabeth Omilami
Sharon Ott
Sheila Page
Shirley Parkinson
Passion
Rebecca Patterson
Carey Perloff
Livia Perez
Victoria Pero
Lisa Peterson
Renee Philippi
Lynn Polan
Joanne Pottlitzer
Kate Powers
June Pyskacek
Shelly Raffle
Lisandra Maria Ramos
Elinor Renfield
Nancy Rhodes
Joumana Rizk
Mary Robinson
Nancy Rogers
Barbara Rosoff
Bevya Rosten
June Rovenger
Susan Rowlands
Barbara Rubin
Deborah Saivetz
Eva Saks
Nancy Salomon
Amy Saltz
Kristen Sanderson
Elyse Singer
Lynne Singer
Anna Deavere Smith
Elaine Smith
Shelley Souza
Hilary Spector
Maurya Swanson
Judy Stewart
Shilarna Stokes
Alison Summers
Sarah Cameron Sunde
Melanie Sutherland
Carol Tanzman
Lynne Taylor-Corbett
Beatrice Terry
Joan Vail Thorne
Laura Tichler
Virlana Tkacz
Susana Tubert
Ching Valdez-Aran
Valeria Vasilevski
Jean Wagner
Marianne Weems
Claudia Weill
Adrienne Weiss
Iona Weissberg
Helen White
Melanie White
B.J. Whiting
Julia Whitworth
Maurya Wickstrom
Rachel Wineberg
Bryna Wortman
Evan Yiounoulis
Gloria Zelaya
Alison Eve Zell

Women of Achievement Awards 
Each year, WP Theater recognizes the extraordinary accomplishments of women from the worlds of entertainment, business, and philanthropy at the Women of Achievement Awards Gala. Since 1986, WP Theater has paid homage to dozens of women who have taken risks, pushed limits, and broken ground in a variety of fields. The event is typically emceed by a female celebrity, with a variety of performances and appearances by other artists. Past recipients of the Women of Achievement Award include Maya Angelou, Katie Couric, Whoopi Goldberg, Billie Jean King, Chita Rivera, and Gloria Steinem.

Women of Achievement Award recipients

Full production history

References

External links
 Official website
 WP Theater Records at the Sophia Smith Collection, Smith College Special Collections

Non-profit organizations based in New York City
Arts organizations established in 1978
Theatre companies in New York City
1978 establishments in New York City
Off-Broadway
Women in theatre
Women in New York City